Brandimarte Tommasi (1591–1648) was a Roman Catholic prelate who served as Auxiliary Bishop of Sabina (1633–1648) and Titular Bishop of Salamis (1633–1648).

Biography
Brandimarte Tommasi was born in Ripatransone, Italy in 1591.
On 26 September 1633, he was appointed by Pope Urban VIII as Titular Bishop of Salamis and Auxiliary Bishop of Sabina.
On 9 October 1633, he was consecrated bishop by Marcello Lante della Rovere, Cardinal-Bishop of Frascati.
 
He served as Auxiliary Bishop of Sabina until his death on 22 July 1648. He is buried in the cathedral of San Liberatore in Magliano Sabina.

References 

17th-century Italian Roman Catholic bishops
Bishops appointed by Pope Urban VIII
1591 births
1648 deaths